Climate Connections was the 2008-09 FIRST Lego League competition. Its theme centered on understanding the effects of climate and climate change.

Project
Teams had to do a project on the subject of climate. Teams were to identify a climate problem in their area, investigate current efforts on the issue locally and in another community, and create an innovative solution to the problem. Teams then had to share their project with others in the community, and present the whole experience at competition.

Gameplay
The table performance portion of Climate Connections is played on a 4 ft by 8 ft field rimmed by wood boards. At competition, two of these fields are placed together to form an 8 ft square. In each -minute match, a team competes on each field with their robot to earn up to 400 points manipulating the mission models.

One of the mission models, Find Agreement (Align The Arrows), straddles both fields in the center. This model earns points for both teams when the arrows are aligned.

The touch penalty objects are levee models. All 8 are worth up to 5 points depending on their position on the field, but are removed from play every time the robot is touched outside of base.

Missions

There were eighteen (18) missions in the Climate Connections game. Each revolved around some topic pertaining to climate change.

 Bury Carbon Dioxide (Carbon Sequestration) - 5 points per ball
 Construct Levees - up to 5 points per block
 Test Levees - 15 points
 Raise The Flood Barrier - 15 points
 Elevate The House - 25 points
 Turn Off The Lights - 20 points
 Open A Window - 25 points
 Get People Together - 10 points per group
 Find Agreement (Align The Arrows) - 40 points for both teams
 Fund Research Or Corrective Action - 15 points
 Deliver An Ice Core Drilling Machine - up to 30 points
 Extract An Ice Core Sample - up to 30 points
 Deliver An Ice Buoy - 25 points
 Insulate A House - 10 points
 Ride A Bicycle - 10 points
 Telecommute And Research - 10 points
 Study Wildlife - up to 25 points
 Beat the Clock - up to 15 points

References

FIRST Lego League games
2008 in robotics